Hubertus Antonius Gerardus Maria "Bert" André (August 6, 1941  – May 21, 2008) was a Dutch actor who started his career in theater and later became known to the greater audiences through his roles in various movies and TV series.

Biography
He started his career as a teacher in Maastricht but moved to Antwerp in 1964, where he studied theater improvisation in what later was known as the Studio Herman Teirlinck. Among his course mates were Jan Decleir and Mike Verdrengh.

One of the first big screen roles was his portrayal of the neighbour Neuteboom in the first and third film about the Flodder (1986) family which resulted in consequent movies and TV series. Some of his other more recognizable work include Ramona and Halleluja!, Mira, Turks Fruit, Soldier of Orange, De Leeuw van Vlaanderen and Boerenpsalm. In the course of his career he performed in more than 150 films between 1967 and 2008.

André has played roles in classical theater pieces written by such playwrights as Shakespeare, Harold Pinter, Chekhov and Samuel Beckett. Although mostly playing supporting roles, he has also taken some leading roles in plays like the farmer in Het gezin van Paemel by Cyriel Buysse.

He was known for his rather cautious diction and soft timbre which later on presented him with the monologues in De Kontrabass by Patrick Süskind.

He played as an actor in such theaters as Antwerp KNS, Groot Limburgs Toneel, the International Nieuwe Scène, Arca and eventually at the Brussels City Theatre.

Personal life
André was married to the Flemish actress Mieke Verheyden and has a daughter Sandrine who is also an actress.

Death
André died at the age of 66 of an intracranial hemorrhage in the hospital of Antwerp where he had resided for some time due to leukemia.

Filmography

Theater (selection) 
 De noces (2005) 
 Spaans stuk (2005) 
 Eerste liefde (2001) 
 Wachtend op Godot (2000) 
 Othello (1997) 
 Geschiedenis van een paard (1989) 
 De kontrabas (1988) 
 Droom van een zomernacht (1984) 
 De Minerva (1981) 
 De Vreemdelingen (1977) 
 De Magistraat of De klucht der Notabelen (The Magistrate) (1970) 
 Hebben (1966)

References

External links 
 
 Bert André (1941–2008)

1941 births
2008 deaths
Dutch male film actors
Dutch male stage actors
Dutch male television actors
Deaths from leukemia
Deaths from cancer in Belgium
Actors from Maastricht
20th-century Dutch male actors